Stanley Bruce Jones (15 October 1908 – 20 October 1972) was an Australian rules footballer who played with Fitzroy in the Victorian Football League (VFL).	

Jones was cleared to North Wangaratta in the Ovens & King Football League in 1932 and played for the O&KFL in a match against Hawthorn the same year.

Notes

External links 
		

1908 births
1972 deaths
Australian rules footballers from Victoria (Australia)
Fitzroy Football Club players
Preston Football Club (VFA) players